Ardent Health Services, formerly known as Behavioral Healthcare Corporation is a healthcare company based in Nashville, Tennessee, United States.

History 
The Behavioral Healthcare Corporation was founded in 1993 by [Edward Stack]. Until 2001, it was a privately held company owned by Kindred Healthcare and Welsh Carson Anderson & Stowe and several individual investors and focused owning and operating behavioral health facilities. It currently owns and operates hospitals in Tulsa, Oklahoma, Albuquerque, New Mexico ([]), Amarillo, Texas, Pocatello, Idaho, Topeka, Kansas, 2 in New Jersey and, as of March 1, 2018, UTHET in Tyler, Texas.

By 2001, the private equity firm Welsh, Carson, Anderson & Stowe became majority shareholders and changed the name of the company.

The company sold its [behavioral health operations to Psychiatric Solutions, Inc.]s in 2005.

In 2015, Ventas acquired the company for $1.75b through a traditional sale-leaseback transaction where Ventas remained the owner of essentially all of Ardent's real property interests while a joint venture between Equity Group Investments, Ventas and several members of management acquired its hospital operations.

In February 2020, Ardent Health Services president and CEO David T. Vandewater announced his plans to retire from the company. He will remained as president and CEO until a successor was named.

In August 2020, Ardent Health Services appointed Martin J. Bonick as president and CEO. Today the company has 26,000 employees, 30 hospitals and over 200 sites of care in six states.

References

External links 
 

Health care companies established in 1993
1993 establishments in Tennessee
Companies based in Nashville, Tennessee
Health care companies based in Tennessee
Frist family
Hospital networks in the United States
Privately held companies based in Tennessee